The Jamanxim River is a river of Pará state in north-central Brazil. Originating in the Serra do Cachimbo, it is a tributary of the Tapajós, into which it flows a few kilometers upstream from Itaituba.

Course

The river flows through the Tapajós-Xingu moist forests ecoregion.
It flows through the Itaituba I National Forest, a  sustainable use conservation area established in 1998.
The river basin also contains part of the  Rio Novo National Park, a conservation unit created in 2006.

Hydroelectric potential

Its hydroelectric potential, along with that of the Tapajós, was assessed by Eletronorte (Centrais Elétricas do Norte do Brasil S.A.), the regional power authority, identifying nine potential dam sites, including four along the Jamanxim. at Cachoeira dos Patos, (estimated at 28 MW); Cachoeira do Caí, (estimated at 802 MW); at Jardim do Ouro and at Jamanxim (estimated at 881 MW). If all were constructed, these dams would flood a total of 103,700 ha, including 33,216 ha of the Jamanxim National Park and 25,849 ha of the Jamanxim, Itaituba I, Itaituba II and Altamira national forests.

See also
List of rivers of Pará

References

Sources

 
 

Rivers of Pará